The 1968 Italian Grand Prix was a Formula One motor race held at the Monza Autodrome on 8 September 1968. It was race 9 of 12 in both the 1968 World Championship of Drivers and the 1968 International Cup for Formula One Manufacturers. The 68-lap race was won by McLaren driver Denny Hulme after he started from seventh position. Johnny Servoz-Gavin finished second for the Matra team and Ferrari driver Jacky Ickx came in third.

There was a five-week break after the previous Grand Prix in Germany. During the break, the Oulton Park Gold Cup attracted some of the top names, with Jackie Stewart taking the victory, after his dominant victory at the Nürburgring.

Report

Entry

24 F1 cars were entered for the event, the biggest field of the season. American Mario Andretti entered in a third Lotus, while his United States Auto Club (USAC) rival, Bobby Unser, replaced Richard Attwood at Owen Racing Organisation (BRM). Scuderia Ferrari ran a third car for rising English star, Derek Bell, while David Hobbs was fielded by Honda Racing.

Qualifying

The early qualifying session saw Andretti and Unser set the pace. Both drivers wanted to fly back to the United States for the Hoosier Hundred at the Indiana State Fairgrounds the following day. They then intended to fly back to Milan and race in the Grand Prix. The event organisers announced that if the either driver returned to the US, they would be banned from competing in the Grand Prix, under an ACI ruling which forbade drivers to complete in another event within 24 hours of the start of the Grand Prix. Both drivers flew back to Indiana for the Hoosier Hundred and did return for the Italian Grand Prix, but were not allowed to take part in the race.

Qualifying resulted in John Surtees taking pole for the Honda Racing team, in their Honda RA301, at an average speed of 150.314 mph. He was joined on the front row by Bruce McLaren in his own McLaren M7A and Chris Amon in a Ferrari 312. The second row was occupied by the Ferrari of Jacky Ickx and the Lotus of Graham Hill. Jackie Stewart, Denny Hulme and Derek Bell shared the third row.

Race
The race was held over 68 laps of the Autodromo Nazionale di Monza, taking place in sunny conditions, with Surtees leading from the start. McLaren and Surtees fought for the lead, until the Ferrari of Chris Amon lost control on oil dropped by one of the Honda RA301s and his car flew over the barriers into the trees at one of the fast Lesmo corners. Surtees also hit the wall trying to avoid the Ferrari. This put Jo Siffert into second place, with Jackie Stewart third. The Scotsman moved into second and a slipstreaming battle developed for the lead between McLaren, Stewart, Siffert and Denny Hulme.

McLaren's M7A had to stop for more oil on lap 35 and retired. Stewart retired on lap 43 when his Cosworth engine failed. Hulme was by this stage already leading the race, and when Siffert went out with a rear suspension failure, nine laps from the end, Hulme was left to win. He won in a time of 1hr 40:14.8mins., averaging a speed of 146.284mph. There had been a battle behind him, between Johnny Servoz-Gavin, Jacky Ickx and Jochen Rindt. The Ferrari of Ickx had emerged ahead, only to stop in the closing lap for more fuel. In the process, he dropped to third behind Servoz-Gavin, while Rindt had to retire with an engine failure. Piers Courage, Jean-Pierre Beltoise, and Jo Bonnier rounded out the top six, with no other finishers.

Classification

Qualifying

Race

Championship standings after the race

Drivers' Championship standings

Constructors' Championship standings

Note: Only the top five positions are included for both sets of standings.

References

Further reading

Italian Grand Prix
Italian Grand Prix
1968 in Italian motorsport